Ua Máel Fogmair II was Bishop of Killala until 1151.

References

12th-century Roman Catholic bishops in Ireland
Bishops of Killala
1151 deaths
Year of birth missing